The Gironde estuary and Pertuis sea Marine Nature Park is a protected area on the Gironde estuary and on the Atlantic coast of the departments Vendée, Charente-Maritime and Gironde, in western France. It was created in April 2015.

Geography

The Marine Nature Park covers 6,500 km2 of marine area and encompasses all the Pertuis narrows, estuaries, the Gironde plume and extends off shore to a 50-metre water height.

As the largest estuary in Western Europe, the Gironde is subject to very strong tidal currents and small islands appear and disappear at the whim of the river. It is located just downstream of the centre of Bordeaux.

114 coastal towns are part of the park along 1,000 kilometres of coastline.

The management board is in Marennes. Other main coastal towns are (from north to south): Saint-Martin-de-Ré, Sainte-Marie-de-Ré, La Rochelle, Rochefort, Saint-Pierre-d'Oléron, Le Château-d'Oléron, La Tremblade, Saint-Palais-sur-Mer, Royan, Soulac-sur-Mer, Pauillac.

Landscape

Oyster farms, harbours and fishing huts mark the landscapes and the maritime culture. Long sandy beaches attract many tourists.

Flora and fauna

Marshes, narrows, reed beds, estuaries, foreshores and the Atlantic Ocean form a mosaic of habitats particularly favourable to birds and amphihaline fish. Leatherback turtles, basking sharks, gannets and storm petrels can also be found. Depending on their life cycle, species such as eels move through the different estuarine, coastal and marine environments.

Gallery

References

External links
 

Nature reserves in France
Landforms of Gironde
Protected areas established in 2015
Marine parks of France